Ilan Mitchell-Smith (born June 29, 1969) is an American academic and former actor, best known as a co-star of the film Weird Science (1985).

Acting career
Mitchell-Smith's very first passion was ballet. He studied as a child and even won a scholarship to dance with the School of American Ballet. While there on his scholarship, he was discovered by a casting director and his film career began in 1982 at age 12 when he played a younger version of the title character in Sidney Lumet's Daniel. After a starring role in the 1984 film The Wild Life, he was cast as Wyatt Donnelly in the 1985 teen film Weird Science by writer/director John Hughes. The film focuses on two nerdy teenage boys who create a woman of their own (played by Kelly LeBrock), as they are unable to find girlfriends.

Mitchell-Smith starred in several other films and TV series, most notably The Chocolate War and Superboy; none of these brought him the same degree of recognition. He decided to leave acting entirely in 1991, his final role being a guest appearance on Silk Stalkings. Recently, Mitchell-Smith has performed select voiceover work (recording for two episodes—"Moon Warriors" and "Heads Will Roll"—of Fox's "Axe Cop").

In 2017, Mitchell-Smith guest-starred in the fifth-season premiere of The Goldbergs, playing science teacher Mr. Connelly. The episode, entitled "Weird Science", was based on his film Weird Science, with series character Barry Goldberg believing he can make a girlfriend in the same manner as the movie.

Academic career
Mitchell-Smith received his A.B. in Medieval Studies from University of California, Davis (UC Davis) and his M.A. in Medieval Studies from Fordham University. He received a doctoral degree from Texas A&M University in 2005. As of January 2020, he is an associate professor in the English department at California State University, Long Beach (CSU Long Beach) in Long Beach, California. For several years prior to his appointment at CSU Long Beach, he was a professor at Angelo State University in San Angelo, Texas. Mitchell-Smith publishes on chivalry in the later Middle Ages, and he also publishes on cinematic, television, and video-game versions of medieval culture.

Table top gaming
Mitchell-Smith has published on Dungeons & Dragons, and is a staff writer for Talk Wargaming and writes a column for Forces of Geek called "Playing the Nerd". He works as a technical writer and editor for smaller independent game producers, and he is an active tabletop gamer and an organizer of tabletop game events in Southern California.

Personal life
Mitchell-Smith was born in New York City, New York. His mother, Clary Mitchell-Smith, is a psychotherapist, and his father, Larry Smith, is an art history teacher.

He met Susannah Demaree at Santa Monica College in Santa Monica, California. They were married in 1995. They have two children, born in 1998 and 2000.

Filmography
How to Be a Perfect Person in Just Three Days (1983)
Daniel (1983) as Younger Daniel
The Wild Life (1984)
Weird Science (1985) as Wyatt Donnelly
The Equalizer (1985 TV series, one episode)
Superboy (1988 TV series)
Journey to the Center of the Earth (1988)
The Chocolate War (1988) as Jerry Renault
Identity Crisis (1989)
Silk Stalkings (1991 TV series, one episode)
Axe Cop (2012 TV series, two episodes)
The Goldbergs as "Mr Connelly" (one episode: "Weird Science")

References

External links

1969 births
Living people
American male film actors
American male television actors
American male child actors
Male actors from New York City
Angelo State University faculty
Santa Monica College alumni
Pasadena City College alumni
California State University, Long Beach faculty
University of California, Davis alumni
Fordham University alumni
Texas A&M University alumni